Lausus or Lausos (c. 400 AD. – c. 450 AD) was a eunuch of the court of Theodosius II, famous for acquiring a palace and a large collection of art and sculptures. He also served as imperial chamberlain (praepositus sacri cubiculi) between 420 and 422 AD. One of the oldest historical accounts of the Christian Church, the Historia Lausiaca, was dedicated to him.

The Palace of Lausus, destroyed in a fire in 475, was supplied by the now-preserved Binbirdirek Cistern in Istanbul.

References 

5th-century Byzantine people
Year of birth uncertain
Byzantine eunuchs
Praepositi sacri cubiculi
Ancient slaves